Cavite's 3rd congressional district is one of the eight congressional districts of the Philippines in the province of Cavite. It has been represented in the House of Representatives of the Philippines since 1987. The district is composed of 97 barangays that is divided into 9 clusters for the city of Imus. It is currently represented in the 19th Congress by Adrian Jay Advincula of the National Unity Party (NUP).

Representation history

See also 
 Legislative districts of Cavite

References 

Congressional districts of the Philippines
Politics of Cavite
1987 establishments in the Philippines
Congressional districts of Calabarzon
Constituencies established in 1987